Saku Salmela (born May 16, 1990) is a Finnish ice hockey defenceman. He is currently playing with HIFK in the Finnish Liiga.

Salmela made his Liiga debut playing with Ilves during the 2014–15 Liiga season.

References

External links

1990 births
Living people
Finnish ice hockey defencemen
Ilves players
Sportspeople from Pori